Events from the year 1981 in North Korea.

Incumbents
Premier: Li Jong-ok 
Supreme Leader: Kim Il-sung

Events

Births
 14 August - Ri Kyong-sok.
 3 November - Song Jong-sun

References

 
North Korea
1980s in North Korea
Years of the 20th century in North Korea
North Korea